Scarred Hearts is a 2016 Romanian / German biographical film based on the eponymous novel by Max Blecher.

Reception
On review aggregator website Rotten Tomatoes, the film holds an approval rating of 78%, based on 18 reviews with an average rating of 7.7/10. On Metacritic, Scarred Hearts' has a score of 70 out of a 100 based on 7 critics, indicating "generally favorable reviews".

Clayton Dillard of Slant Magazine wrote "Despite the film's bleak premise, writer-director Radu Jude finds dark humor within the certainty of death". Ben Kenigsberg of The New York Times added "It's the rare page-to-screen adaptation in which the camera becomes an essential character".

According to Jay Weissberg of Variety, "The former's narrative drive was strong enough to minimize concerns over possible information gaps, the latter's unannotated immersion coupled with its episodic structure suggests the film won't have the same pull".

Awards
At the 2017 Gopo Awards, Scarred Hearts won for Best Cinematography (Marius Panduru) (award shared ex aequo with Andrei Butică for Dogs''); Best Art Direction (Cristian Niculescu); Best Costumes (Dana Păpăruz); and Best Make-up and Hairstyling (Bianca Boeroiu, Domnica Bodogan).

References

External links

2010s biographical films
Romanian biographical films
German biographical films
Films directed by Radu Jude
2010s German films